Boom Boom Beat may refer to:

Boom Boom Beat, album by Australian TV children's presenters Best Children's Album ARIA Music Awards of 2002
"Boom Boom Beat", 2001 song by Australian TV children's presenters Hi-5 (Australian band)
Boom Boom Beat Eurobeat label
Boom Boom Beat (Puffy AmiYumi song)